Nikolay Dmitriyevich Peskov (born 3 February 1990), also known as Nikolai Choles (Николай Чоулз) is the son of Kremlin Press Secretary Dmitry Peskov.

Biography 
Peskov was born 3 February 1990 in Moscow. He is the eldest son of Dmitry Peskov and Anastasia Budyonny. He is a great-grandson of Semyon Budyonny. He moved with his mother to the United Kingdom in the 1990s. Peskov sometimes uses his stepfather's surname, Choles. He was educated in Britain. 
 
From 2010 to 2012, Peskov was in the Russian Strategic Rocket Forces and participated in the 2012 Moscow Victory Day Parade. He briefly worked as a correspondent for RT.

In 2017, Peskov's opulent lifestyle was criticized by Russian opposition politician Alexei Navalny. Peskov responded on RBK that Navalny's report was "a provocation."

On 11 March 2022, following the 2022 Russian invasion of Ukraine, Peskov was added to the list of specially designated nationals who are sanctioned by the United States Department of the Treasury as part of the international sanctions during the Russo-Ukrainian War. On 15 March 2022, Peskov was sanctioned by the United Kingdom and is barred from traveling to the country. 

Regarding the 2022 Russian mobilization, Peskov told pranksters, who pretended to be recruitment officers, that he had no intention of going to war and would resolve the issue "on a different level." It was seen as an example of nepotism in Putin's Russia.

Criminal record 
Peskov was in a young offender institution for stealing a mobile phone and took courses for alcohol abuse and anger management. This was after a 2010 incident when Peskov and two other men "(punched) a teenager in the face during a mobile phone theft" outside a McDonald's in Milton Keynes. He was given a 15-month sentence. Peskov claimed that he was estranged from his family and had been kicked out by his family at the age of 16.

In 2016, it was alleged that Peskov was the subject of a police investigation for beating his grandmother, Inese Budyonny, a 71-year-old pensioner.

References 

Living people
1990 births
Military personnel from Moscow
Russian emigrants to the United Kingdom
21st-century Russian military personnel
RT (TV network) people
Television reporters and correspondents
Russian reporters and correspondents
Russian individuals subject to the U.S. Department of the Treasury sanctions
Russian individuals subject to European Union sanctions
Peskov family